The Globe and Mail Centre is a 17-storey building, on King Street East, in Toronto, Ontario, Canada, that houses the offices of The Globe and Mail newspaper, and other tenants.
The building is adjacent to the former offices of rival newspaper the Toronto Sun, towering over it.
Archeologists were allowed to excavate the foundations of Berkeley House, which were uncovered while removing a parking lot in preparation for digging foundations for the new building. 

The building was complete enough for some tenants to move in during 2016.

Design

One of the standout features of the Globe and Mail Centre is its stunning architecture. The building was designed by award-winning architect Siamak Hariri, and it features a striking glass façade that allows natural light to flood the interior spaces. The building's interior is equally impressive, with modern finishes and sleek design elements that make it a stylish and sophisticated venue for any event.

The building has a four-storey podium, sitting on top of multiple storeys of subterranean parking.  An additional thirteen storeys of offices occupy the tower.  The ground floor houses multiple small shops.

The building has a "green roof".

Event Venue

The Globe and Mail Centre features a range of event spaces, including a grand ballroom that can accommodate up to 1,000 guests for wedding venue, a spacious lobby that is ideal for receptions, and smaller conference rooms for more intimate gatherings. The building is also equipped with state-of-the-art audiovisual technology, including high-quality sound systems, projection screens, and LED lighting.

References

External links
 

Buildings and structures in Toronto